is a private university in Nishi-sugamo, Toshima, Tokyo, Japan. The university was founded in the last year of the Taishō period (1926) by merging the three Buddhist colleges. 
The three were:
 the Tendai-shū College (Tendai-shū daigaku', founded in 1885),
 the Buzan College (Buzan daigaku, founded in 1887 and funded by Shingon-shū Buzan-ha), and
 the Religious College (Shūkyō daigaku'', founded in 1887 and funded by Jōdo-shū).

Its school precepts are based on the Tendai school of Buddhism. The concept for the university began when five doctors—Junjiro Takakusu, Masaharu Anesaki, Eun Maeda, Senshō Murakami and Masataro Sawayanagi—who were leaders of Buddhist society in Japan, proposed creating a Buddhist university union.

Undergraduate school
The undergraduate school consists of the Faculty of Regional Development, Faculty of Psychology and Sociology, Faculty of Human Studies, Faculty of Literature, Faculty of Communication and Culture, and Faculty of Buddhist Studies.

Graduate school
The graduate school offers Advanced Buddhist Studies, Advanced Human Studies, and Advanced Literary Studies.

Other programs
It has a one-year program in which up to 40 overseas students are admitted each year to a special course. This prepares them for enrollment in undergraduate or graduate programs at Japanese universities.

Locations
  Sugamo Campus (3-20-1, Nishi-sugamo, Toshima, Tokyo)
  Saitama Campus (Kita-Katsushika, Matsubushi, Saitama)

Partner organizations
 Dongguk University (South Korea)
 University of Hawaii (United States)
 Henan University (China)

Notable alumni
 Yosuke Asari (actor)
 Kōji Fukada (film director)
 Kazue Fukiishi (actress)　
 Harue Koga (painter)

Access
The closest train stations to the Sugamo Campus are:
 Nishi-sugamo Station (2 minutes' walk)
 Shin-Koshinzuka Station or Koshinzuka Station (7 minutes' walk)
 Itabashi Station (10 minutes' walk)

References

 UniRank

External links
 Official website 
 American Association of Teachers of Japanese

Toshima
Private universities and colleges in Japan
Taisho University
Buddhist universities and colleges in Japan
Educational institutions established in 1926
1926 establishments in Japan